José Soto Martínez (born 15 March 1946) is a Mexican politician affiliated with the Convergence. He currently serves as Deputy of the LXII Legislature of the Mexican Congress representing Oaxaca.

References

1946 births
Living people
Politicians from Guanajuato
Members of the Congress of Oaxaca
Citizens' Movement (Mexico) politicians
21st-century Mexican politicians
Deputies of the LXII Legislature of Mexico
Members of the Chamber of Deputies (Mexico) for Oaxaca